"Hypnotize U" is a song by American group N.E.R.D., released on October 16, 2010, as the second single off their fourth studio album, Nothing. It was produced by the Neptunes and Daft Punk.

Music video
A music video for "Hypnotize U" was filmed. It was released on November 2, 2010. It shows the group's frontman Pharrell at a mansion with a group of beautiful women, who act as though hypnotized by him.

Track listing
Digital download
 "Hypnotize U" – (4:19)
 "Hypnotize U" (Nero remix) – (5:34)
 "Hypnotize U" (Nico de Andrea remix) – (5:11)

CD album
 "Hot-n-Fun" (featuring Nelly Furtado) – (3:22)
 "Party People" (featuring T.I.) – (3:42)
 "Hypnotize U" – (4:19)

iTunes download
 "Hypnotize U" – (4:19)

Remixes
 "Hypnotize U" (Dirty South Remix) – (5:40)
 "Hypnotize U" (Nero remix) – (5:34)
 "Hypnotize U" (Alex Metric remix) – (6:10)
 "Hypnotize U" (Steve Duda remix) – (4:46)
 "Hypnotize U" (Tong and Rodgers Wonderland Radio remix) – (4:20)

Live performances
N.E.R.D. performed the song live at Brooklyn on July 13, 2010. They also performed the single at MP3 on June 15, 2010, as well as alongside Chris Brown at New York City. They also performed it on the Late Show with David Letterman.

Charts

References

2010 singles
N.E.R.D. songs
Songs written by Pharrell Williams
Song recordings produced by the Neptunes
Songs written by Thomas Bangalter
Songs written by Guy-Manuel de Homem-Christo
2010 songs
Interscope Records singles